The Troodos Ophiolite on the island of Cyprus represents a Late Cretaceous spreading axis (mid-ocean ridge) that has since been uplifted due to its positioning on the overriding Anatolian plate at the Cyprus arc and ongoing subduction to the south of the Eratosthenes Seamount.

Stratigraphy

The lowest units of the ophiolite are the Lower Pillow Lavas, controversially separated from the Upper Pillow Lavas. Filling spaces in between the pillows in the pillow lava units are dispersed metal oxide sediments that can also be seen as veins filling cooling fractures within the lavas. The metal oxides are ferruginous with ferromanganese oxides, clays, carbonates, volcanic glass and pelagic sediments.

Above the pillow lava units lies a layer of ferromaganiferous mudstones and clastic volcanics (the epiclastics). The epiclastites are massive altered lava fragments in a mud matrix, usually ferromanganiferous. Overlying this is the massive-finely laminated ferromanganese muds. Between the epiclastics and muds lie background accumulations of pelagic sediment.

To the south there is the Mathiati-Margi massive sulfide ore body and stockwork mineralisation. The sulfide ore occurs at the same stratigraphic level as the Lower and Upper pillow lava contact, and is overlain by unmineralised lavas.

Petrology

Dunite bodies (olivine) are common in the mantle series of the Troodos, and contain chromite concentrations.
 
The sheeted dykes show a general tholeiitic trend, of basalts, andesites and dacites.  There is no obvious boundary for the compositional differences, but the lower lavas are generally more enriched and evolved (silicic) while the upper lavas are less evolved and depleted.

The geochemical evidence implies that the Troodos ophiolite has come from mantle that has already been depleted, with extraction of mid ocean ridge basalt, but then subsequently enriched in certain trace elements as well as water. Along with the alkaline character of the plagiogranites it can be assumed that the spreading ridge of the Troodos was situated above a subduction zone, but the mantle from which lavas were extruded was that of mantle that had recently lost a melt fraction.

Metallogenesis of the Troodos Ophiolite
The Troodos is a unique ophiolite in terms of observing hydrothermal alteration, because it has not been metamorphosed to a high extent or deformed extensively. Therefore, it is easy to see the successions and relationships of the hydrothermal processes to the structure of the ridge. This is difficult to observe in modern ridges due to accessibility problems, and so the Troodos gives a unique view into these processes. The fact that the same kinds of alteration can be seen in modern axes implies the same processes happened at the Troodos, even though it was formed in a supra-subduction zone.

Alteration of the lavas is related to both axial hydrothermal systems and crustal aging in a submarine environment.  Fluid can be shown to have penetrated at least to the base of the plutonic sequence where high temperature and secondary phases in the plutonics and cumulates imply alteration close to the ridge axis.

The presence of alteration in all of the extrusive levels but the very highest imply a succession of numerous hydrothermal convection cells active during eruption.

As the crustal sequence gradually moved off of the spreading axis, there was cessation of the main metalliferous deposition and progressive restriction of water/rock action and eventually water interaction was restricted to within rock units as the crust was sealed off. This caused precipitation of late stage zeolites and carbonates.

Black smokers
The massive sulfide deposits can also be shown to have formed at the same temperature as modern day black smokers, which provides evidence that these could be formed from the smokers.

Reconstruction of a spreading-axis
In terms of the physical mechanism of spreading the Troodos spreading axis is broadly comparable to that of a modern intermediate spreading ridge. The eruption rates along the ridge are high so there is little time for sediment accumulation during active periods. In terms of lava geochemistry and stratigraphy, however, Troodos is more likely to have formed in a subduction initiation setting

Troodos' role in understanding modern mid-ocean ridge processes
Research on the Troodos flourished after the late 1960s revolution on the fact that ophiolites represented fragments of ocean crust, where then petrologic and secondly structural studies were done on various ophiolites around the world. Interpretations of the Troodos have advanced understandings of the construction of ocean lithosphere, the nature of the seismic layering of the oceanic crust and the magmatic, structural and hydrothermal processes at the ridges. Also, importantly it has helped with understandings of the mechanisms associated with plate collision.

In the early 1970s it began to be widely accepted that the ophiolite represented sea-floor spreading, and subsequently that the Troodos showed geochemical signatures like that of arc volcanics. This last fact was first pushed by Akiho Miyashiro in 1973 who challenged the common conception of Troodos Ophiolite and proposed an island arc origin for it. This was done arguing that numerous lavas and dykes in the ophiolite had calc-alkaline chemistries. In the early 1980s the term supra-subduction zone was coined to infer the formation of lavas above a subducting lithospheric slab, with no specification of where in relation to the subducting slab they form. From subsequent studies of other ophiolites it has been found that these generally have a similar geochemical signature, and so it is inferred that most are supra-subduction zone related.

In the Troodos ophiolite it was observed from the variation in magma types, which can be seen to go from evolved to less evolved mafic rocks in localised cross cutting field relationships implying the presence of more than one magma chamber that cuts other exhausted ones. This has now been shown to be supported from other ophiolite bodies such as Oman.

In terms of ophiolite emplacement, there was a problem of how to uplift dense oceanic lithosphere through 5–6 km of water and onto continents. This process, however it happened, was coined obduction. The processes could possibly vary depending on the active or passive type of margin encountered, such as Tethyan or Cordilleran margins. In Tethyan passive margins gravity sliding over accretionary terranes via low angle thrust faults was proposed. On the Cordilleran margin, lithospheric fragments are incorporated into accretionary terranes. In the Troodos, gravity surveys have implied that the ophiolite is underlain by continental crust whose relative buoyancy uplifted the ocean crust, which in some circumstances could eventually lead to sliding onto the accretionary wedge (or now Eratostines seamount subducted for Troodos).

In the supra-subduction zone, spreading is not controlled like in mid-ocean ridge settings, as the extension is mainly facilitated by slab rollback that creates space independently of the availability of magma. Therefore, the fastest spreading rates are caused by the most rapid rollback and thus favours a magmatic spreading as in many cases the mantle may not be able to keep up with the spreading. Therefore, there is unusually thinned crust, large low-angle extensional faults are common and much crustal rotation.

See also
Geology of Cyprus

References

Geology of Cyprus
Ophiolites